The Ballet Girl is a 1916 American silent drama film directed by George Irving and starring Alice Brady, Holbrook Blinn and Robert Frazer. It is an adaptation of the 1912 novel Carnival by the British writer Compton Mackenzie.

Cast
 Alice Brady as Jenny Pearl 
 Holbrook Blinn as Zachary Trewehella 
 Robert Frazer as Fred Pearl 
 Julia Stuart as Mrs. Raeburn 
 Harry Danes as Charles Raeburn 
 Laura McClure as May Raeburn 
 Jessie Lewis as Irene Dale
 Alec B. Francis as Jerry Vergoe 
 George Relph as Maurice Avery 
 Stanhope Wheatcroft as Fuzz Castleton 
 Fred Radcliffe as Joe Cunningham 
 Robert Kegerreis as Jack Danby

References

Bibliography
 Goble, Alan. The Complete Index to Literary Sources in Film. Walter de Gruyter, 1999.

External links
 

1916 films
1916 drama films
1910s English-language films
American silent feature films
Silent American drama films
Films directed by George Irving
American black-and-white films
World Film Company films
Films shot in Fort Lee, New Jersey
Films based on British novels
1910s American films